Great Goddess is the concept of an almighty goddess or mother goddess, or a matriarchal religion.  Apart from various specific figures called this from various cultures, the Great Goddess hypothesis, is a postulated fertility goddess supposed to have been worshipped in the Neolithic era across most of Eurasia at least.  Scholarly belief in this hypothesis has reduced in recent decades, though theological belief in a Great Goddess is common in the Goddess movement.

Specific examples include:
Great Goddess, referring to the Greek and Roman goddess Cybele; also associated with Rhea (mother of the gods) and Gaia (mother of the Titans)
Great Goddess, anglicized form of the Roman Magna Dea
Great Goddess, anglicized form of the Sanskrit Mahadevi, the Shakti sum of all goddesses
Magu (deity), a deity in Chinese and Korean myth
Great Goddess of Teotihuacan, an ancient Mesoamerican deity
Great Goddess, also known as the Triple Goddess, an important feminine deity of the Neopagan religion of Wicca

See also
Goddess
Goddess movement
Goddess worship (disambiguation) 
Great Mother (disambiguation)

Broad-concept articles
Goddesses